Ron Yerxa (born May 18, 1947) is an American film producer. He is known for the films Little Miss Sunshine, Mr. Russo, Hamlet 2 and Cold Mountain.

Yerxa and fellow producer Albert Berger founded the production company, Bona Fide Productions, and the two producers were nominated for an Academy Award for Best Picture for the 2013 film Nebraska.

Yerxa attended the University of California Santa Cruz and Stanford University.

References

External links

1947 births
Living people
American film producers